Aestrith of Sweden - Swedish: Astrid - may refer to:

Astrid Njalsdotter (died 1060), Queen consort of Sweden
Astrid Olofsdotter (died 1035), Princess of Sweden who became Queen of Norway in 1019
Astrid of Sweden (1905–1935), Princess of Sweden who became Queen of Belgium